Petru Racu (born 17 July 1987) is a Moldovan professional footballer who plays as a defender for FC Milsami Orhei and the Moldova national team. Racu is a physically strong and aggressive defender who is capable of playing in a three or four-man defence.

Club career

Zimbru Chișinău
Racu made his professional debut with Zimbru Chisinau in the Moldovan league in 2003. He won his first trophy in June 2004 at the age of sixteen by helping Zimbru win the Moldovan Cup.

At the end of the 2003–04 season he was named "Best Young Player of the Year" by the Moldovan Football Federation.

IFK Norrköping
In February 2007, Racu moved to Swedish club IFK Norrköping, where he played successfully for five years.

During the 2008 season, he was loaned to the Finnish club MYPA and managed to scored a goal on his debut.

FC Hjørring
In January 2012, Racu transferred to the Danish club FC Hjørring.

Veris Chisinau
After playing for 6 years in Scandinavia, Racu returned to Moldovan football in 2013, signed with FC Veris Chisinau and become bronze medalist in 2013-14 Moldovan National Division.

In December 2014 he was named "Best Moldovan Defender" by the Moldovan Football Federation.

Milsami Orhei
In January 2015, Racu signed with Milsami Orhei and won its first league title 2014-15 Moldovan National Division, becoming the first team to take the title away from the cities of Chișinău and FC Sheriff Tiraspol.

Racu scored the winning goal in the UEFA Champions League qualification match against Ludogorets Razgrad, a game that ended 2–1.

Sheriff Tiraspol
In the summer of 2017, Racu moved to fellow Moldovan club Sheriff Tiraspol. He won the Moldovan National Division with Sheriff Tiraspol in 2017 and 2018.

In the 2017–18 UEFA Europa League season, Sheriff Tiraspol reached the group stage and Racu played in all six group matches.

Neftchi Baku
On 15 February 2019, Racu joined his old manager Roberto Bordin at Neftchi Baku, signing until the end of the 2018–19 season. At the end of that season Racu became silver medalist with Neftchi Baku.

Petrolul Ploiești
On 9 July 2019, Racu signed a contract with Romanian Liga II side Petrolul Ploiești.

Petrocub Hincesti
In January 2020, Racu returned to Moldova and joined FC Petrocub Hîncești Racu helped the club to win his first major trophy Moldovan Cup and become silver medalist in Moldovan National Division, best season and performance in club history.

Milsami Orhei
In summer 2021, Racu returned to the Red Eagles FC Milsami Orhei

International career
On 11 August 2010, Racu debuted in Moldova national football team, in a friendly match 0–0 against Georgia. He played in total 50 games from 2010 to 2020 for Moldova national football team.

Personal life

Racu was raised in Chisinau, Republic of Moldova. Has one sibling Dorin. He holds two citizenship moldovan and swedish, also speaks fluently four languages: English, swedish, romanian and Russian.

In June 2020, Racu successfully completed the bachelor's exam at the Faculty of International Law of the Free International University of the Republic of Moldova "ULIM".
The subject of the dissertation was "Advisory Bodies in the Institutional System of the European Union: Structure and Functions."

In 2008, Racu married Jenjira Mix Haxholm. They divorced in 2015.

In March 2021, Petru married Elizaveta Zburliuc. "

Body art

Petru has more than 25 tattoos, including one in honour of his mother, Maria, who died in November 2020 of COVID-19; in addition, he also has tattoos of viking, Jason Voorhees, Dovahkiin, wolf, tiger, eagle, grizzly bear, french bulldog, shark, dagger, mace and lots of others.

Business
In November 2021, Racu launched the production of Vegetal cold-pressed oils. The factory is located in the village of Ghidighici, Chisinau. In August 2022, Vegetal became first and only company from the Republic of Moldova, in the field, certified ECO according to Regulation EC 834/07 by the International Certifying Body CERES GmbH Germany.

Honours

Zimbru Chișinău
Moldovan Cup Winner 2004
Bronze Medalist Moldovan National Division 2004

IFK Norrköping
Champion Swedish Superettan 2007
Silver Medalist Swedish Superettan 2010

Veris Chisinau
Bronze Medalist Moldovan National Division 2014

Milsami Orhei
Champion Moldovan National Division 2015
Bronze Medalist Moldovan National Division 2017

Sheriff Tiraspol
Champion Moldovan National Division 2017
Champion Moldovan National Division 2018

Neftchi Baku
Silver Medalist Azerbaijan Premier League 2019

Petrocub Hincesti
Moldovan Cup Winner 2020
Silver Medalist Moldovan National Division 2020

Milsami Orhei
Bronze Medalist Moldovan National Division 2022

Individual
Best Moldovan Young Player of the year 2004 by the Moldovan Football Federation
Best Moldovan Defender of the year 2014 by the Moldovan Football Federation

References

External links
 Official IFK Norrköping profile 
 
 Profile on football-lineups.com

1987 births
Living people
Footballers from Chișinău
Moldovan footballers
Moldova international footballers
Association football defenders
Moldovan Super Liga players
FC Zimbru Chișinău players
FC Veris Chișinău players
FC Milsami Orhei players
FC Sheriff Tiraspol players
Allsvenskan players
Superettan players
IFK Norrköping players
Veikkausliiga players
Myllykosken Pallo −47 players
Danish 1st Division players
Vendsyssel FF players
Azerbaijan Premier League players
Neftçi PFK players
Liga II players
FC Petrolul Ploiești players
CS Petrocub Hîncești players
Moldovan expatriate footballers
Moldovan expatriate sportspeople in Sweden
Expatriate footballers in Sweden
Moldovan expatriate sportspeople in Finland
Expatriate footballers in Finland
Moldovan expatriate sportspeople in Denmark
Expatriate men's footballers in Denmark
Moldovan expatriate sportspeople in Azerbaijan
Expatriate footballers in Azerbaijan
Moldovan expatriate sportspeople in Romania
Expatriate footballers in Romania